Hayden Ross Coulson (born 17 June 1998) is an English professional footballer who plays as a defender for Scottish Premiership club Aberdeen, on loan from Middlesbrough.

Club career

Middlesbrough
Coulson made five appearances for Middlesbrough in the 2015–16 UEFA Youth League,
before signing his first professional contract with the club on 1 July 2016.

St Mirren (loan)
On 9 July 2018, Coulson joined newly promoted Scottish Premiership side St Mirren on a season-long loan. He would make his debut soon after, starting in a goalless draw with Kilmarnock at Rugby Park in the Scottish League Cup. The club would eventually emerge as 3–2 winners in the penalty shootout, with Coulson scoring one of their penalties, on 13 July 2018. He went on to score his first goal for the club on 28 July 2018, scoring in the first minute against Dumbarton in a 6–0 League Cup win. Coulson returned to Middlesbrough on 17 October 2018 after his loan was cut short, having made a total of 11 appearances for the Scottish Premiership side in all competitions, scoring once.

Cambridge United (loan)
On 31 January 2019, Coulson joined League Two club Cambridge United on loan until the end of the season.

Return to Middlesbrough
Following his return from his loan at Cambridge, Coulson broke into the Middlesbrough squad for the 2019–20 season. He made his league debut for the club on the opening day of the season in a 3–3 away draw with Luton Town. On 1 February 2020, Coulson scored a first league goal of his career, equalising fifteen minutes from time in a 1–1 draw with Blackburn Rovers. Coulson appeared 29 times in the EFL Championship season, including six times after the return following a break on account of the COVID-19 pandemic.

Ipswich Town (loan)
Coulson joined League One side Ipswich Town on loan on 9 August 2021. On 31 January 2022, Coulson was recalled by Middlesbrough having made just six appearances for the club.

Peterborough United (loan)
Following his recall from Ipswich Town, Coulson joined Championship side Peterborough United on loan until the end of the 2021–22 season.

Aberdeen (loan) 
On 26 July 2022, Coulson joined Scottish Premier League side Aberdeen, on a season-long loan.

International career
Coulson has represented England at U16, U17 and U18 level. Coulson earned a call up to the U19 in 2016. He made his national team debut in a 1–0 victory over Northern Ireland U16.

Career statistics

References

External links
 

1998 births
Living people
English footballers
Footballers from Gateshead
Association football fullbacks
Association football wingers
England youth international footballers
Middlesbrough F.C. players
St Mirren F.C. players
Cambridge United F.C. players
Ipswich Town F.C. players
Peterborough United F.C. players
Scottish Professional Football League players
English Football League players
Aberdeen F.C. players